Nepenthes khasiana (after the Khasi Hills, to which it is largely endemic) is an endangered tropical pitcher plant of the genus Nepenthes.  It is the only Nepenthes species native to India. It is thought to attract prey by means of blue fluorescence.

The species has a very localised distribution and is rare in the wild. But with new advancement in agro-technology and tissue culture, it is now being cultivated in campus of Nagaland University, Nagaland. These Pitcher Plants which are endemic to Meghalaya can be seen widely as decorative plants outside many houses of Nagaland.

Isolated populations are known to occur in the Jarain area of the Jaintia Hills, the Baghmara area of the Garo Hills, adjacent to the Khasi Hills region of Meghalaya, in the Upper Kharthong area, of Dima Hasao district Assam and in some parts of Nagaland.Nevertheless, N. khasiana exhibits considerable genetic diversity.

The Khasi people call the plant tiew-rakot, which means demon-flower or devouring-plant. The Jaintias call it kset phare, which is roughly translated as lidded fly net. The Garo call the plant memang-koksi, which literally means the basket of the devil and the Biate tribe of Assam call the plant Jug-Par which means Jug-flower or Loisul Kola which literally means Pitcher-plant.Nepenthes khasiana is a protected species, classified as endangered, and is listed under CITES Appendix I meaning commercial international trade is prohibited. Threats to wild populations include habitat destruction, acid mine drainage associated with coal mining, and collection for medicinal and ornamental uses. In 2010, the Rare Nepenthes Collection was established with the aim of conserving 4 of the most threatened Nepenthes species: N. aristolochioides, N. clipeata, N. khasiana, and N. rigidifolia.

The specific epithet khasiana is spelled khasyana in some older texts. This spelling actually predates that under which the species was formally published in Joseph Dalton Hooker's 1873 monograph, "Nepenthaceae", as it appeared in an article by Maxwell T. Masters in the April 20, 1872 issue of The Gardeners' Chronicle and Agricultural Gazette (this article was itself based on the manuscript of Hooker's monograph). In the horticultural trade of the late 19th century, N. khasiana was often confused with N. distillatoria of Sri Lanka.

References

Further reading

 Ahmed, M. 2010. Nepenthes khasiana Hook. f. (Endemic). In: Medicinal Plants. MJP Publishers, Chennai.
 Bahadur, V., K.S. Kirad, A. Mathew & D.B. Singh 2008. Tissue culture studies in Nepenthes khasiana. Acta Horticulturae (ISHS) 786: 287–293.
 Balakrishnan, N.P. 1983. Flora of Jowai and Vicinity, Meghalaya. Volume 2. Botanical Survey of India, Howrah.
 Bauer, U., C.J. Clemente, T. Renner & W. Federle 2012. Form follows function: morphological diversification and alternative trapping strategies in carnivorous Nepenthes pitcher plants. Journal of Evolutionary Biology 25(1): 90–102. 
 Bordoloi, R.P.M. 1977. The Pitcher Plant: Nepenthes khasiana. Carnivorous plants of North East India I. Dutta Baruah, Gauhati.
 Brown, J. 2013. Nepenthes khasianas chitin-induced pitcher liquid: a potential treatment for opportunistic fungal infection. Carnivorous Plant Newsletter 42(2): 62–65.
 Choudhury, A. 2000. Range extension of Nepenthes khasiana in the Jaintia Hills, Meghalaya. Journal of the Bombay Natural History Society 97(1): 166–167.
 Devi, N.R. 2004. Reproductive biology of endemic and endangered insectivorous Indian species Nepenthes khasiana Hk. f.. Ph.D. thesis, North Eastern Hill University, Shillong.
 Devi, R. & N. Venugopal 2006. The status of insectivorous plants in North-East India: their uses and conservation. The Journal of the Swamy Botanical Club 23(1–4): 75–80.
 Devi, S.P., S.R. Rao, S. Kumaria & P. Tandon 2012. Mitotic chromosome studies in Nepenthes khasiana, an endemic insectivorous plant of Northeast India. Cytologia 77(3): 381–384. 
 Devi, S.P., S. Kumaria, S.R. Rao & P. Tandon 2013. In vitro propagation and assessment of clonal fidelity of Nepenthes khasiana Hook. f.: a medicinal insectivorous plant of India. Acta Physiologiae Plantarum 35(9): 2813–2820. 
 Devi, S.P., S. Kumaria, S.R. Rao & P. Tandon 2014. Single primer amplification reaction (SPAR) methods reveal subsequent increase in genetic variations in micropropagated plants of Nepenthes khasiana Hook. f. maintained for three consecutive regenerations. Gene, published online on 16 January 2014. 
 Eilenberg, H., S. Pnini-Cohen, S. Schuster, A. Movtchan & A. Zilberstein 2006. Isolation and characterization of chitinase genes from pitchers of the carnivorous plant Nepenthes khasiana. Journal of Experimental Botany 57(11): 2775–2784. 
 Eilenberg, H., S. Pnini-Cohen, Y. Rahamim, E. Sionov, E. Segal, S. Carmeli & A. Zilberstein 2010. Induced production of antifungal naphthoquinones in the pitchers of the carnivorous plant Nepenthes khasiana. Journal of Experimental Botany 61(3): 911–922. 
 Haridasan, K. & R.R. Rao 1987. Forest Flora of Meghalaya. Volume II. Bishen Sing Mahendra Pal Singh, Dehradun.
 Jain, S.K. & A.K. Baishya 1977. Nepenthes khasiana: an endangered species. Hornbill: 17–18.
 Jain, S.K. 1987. Endangered species of medicinal herbs in India. Medicinal Herbs in Indian Life 16(1): 44–53.
 Jebb, M. & Cheek, M. 1997. A skeletal revision of Nepenthes (Nepenthaceae). Blumea 42(1): 1–106.
 Jeeva, S., J.T. Sawian, F.G. Lyndem, R.C. Laloo & N. Venugopal 2007. Medicinal plants in Northeast India: past, present and future scenario. In: A. Lakshmi Prabha (ed.) National Seminar on Past, Present and Future Scenario in Medicinal Plants and Phytochemistry. Bharathidasan University, Tiruchirappalli. pp. 18–19.
 Joseph, J. & K.M. Joseph 1986. Insectivorous Plants of Khasi and Jaintia Hills, Meghalaya, India: A Preliminary Survey. Botanical Survey of India, Calcutta.
 Latha, P.G. & S. Seeni 1994. Multiplication of the endangered Indian pitcher plant (Nepenthes khasiana) through enhanced axillary branching in vitro. Plant Cell, Tissue and Organ Culture 38(1): 69–71. 
 Mandal, B. & A. Mukherjee 2011.  Current Science 100(6): 807.
 Mao, A.A. & P. Kharbuli 2002. Distribution and status of Nepenthes khasiana Hook. f.—a rare endemic pitcher plant of Meghalaya, India. Phytotaxonomy 2: 77–83.
 Mao, A.A. & R.A. Ranyaphi 2007. Seed viability studies in Nepenthes khasiana Hook.f.: comparison of in vivo and in vitro seed germination. Bulletin of the Botanical Survey of India 49(1–4): 1–246.
 Meimberg, H., P. Dittrich, G. Bringmann, J. Schlauer & G. Heubl 2000. Molecular phylogeny of Caryophyllidae s.l. based on matK sequences with special emphasis on carnivorous taxa. Plant Biology 2(2): 218–228. 
 Meimberg, H., A. Wistuba, P. Dittrich & G. Heubl 2001. Molecular phylogeny of Nepenthaceae based on cladistic analysis of plastid trnK intron sequence data. Plant Biology 3(2): 164–175. 
  Meimberg, H. 2002.  Ph.D. thesis, Ludwig Maximilian University of Munich, Munich.
 Meimberg, H. & G. Heubl 2006. Introduction of a nuclear marker for phylogenetic analysis of Nepenthaceae. Plant Biology 8(6): 831–840. 
 Mukerjee, A., D.P. Dam & N. Dam 1984. Pitcher plant—an ornamental climber of Meghalaya. Ind. Hort. April–June 1: 6–18.
 Nongrum, I., S. Kumaria & P. Tandon 2009. Multiplication through in vitro seed germination and pitcher development in Nepenthes khasiana Hook. f., a unique insectivorous plant of India. Journal of Horticultural Science & Biotechnology 84(3): 329–332.
 Nongrum, I., S. Kumar, S. Kumaria & P. Tandon 2012. Genetic variation and gene flow estimation of Nepenthes khasiana Hook. F- a threatened insectivorous plant of India as revealed by RAPD markers. Journal of Crop Science and Biotechnology 15(2): 53–57.  
 Raj, G., R. Kurup, A.A. Hussain & S. Baby 2011. Distribution of naphthoquinones, plumbagin, droserone, and 5-O-methyl droserone in chitin-induced and uninduced Nepenthes khasiana: molecular events in prey capture. Journal of Experimental Botany 62(15): 5429–5436. 
 Rao, T.A., P.G. Shanware & G.N. Tribedi 1969. A note on the pitcher plant habitat in Assam. Indian Forester 95(9): 611–613.
 Rathore, T.S., P. Tandon & N.S. Shekhawat 1991. In vitro regeneration of pitcher plant (Nepenthes khasiana Hook. f.) — a rare insectivorous plant of India. Journal of Plant Physiology 139(2): 246–248. 
 Redwood, G.N. & J.C. Bowling 1990. Micropropagation of Nepenthes species. Botanic Gardens Micropropagation News 1(2): 19–20.
 Renner, T. & C.D. Specht 2012. Molecular and functional evolution of class I chitinases for plant carnivory in the Caryophyllales. Molecular Biology and Evolution 29(10): 2971–2985. 
 Riedel, M., A. Eichner, H. Meimberg & R. Jetter 2007. Chemical composition of epicuticular wax crystals on the slippery zone in pitchers of five Nepenthes species and hybrids. Planta 225(6): 1517–1534. 
 Rodgers, W.A. & S. Gupta 1989. The pitcher plant (Nepenthes khasiana Hk. f.) sanctuary of Jaintia Hills, Meghalaya: lessons for conservation. Journal of the Bombay Natural History Society 86(1): 17–21. 
 Singh, B., S.J. Phukan, B.K. Sinha, V.N. Singh & S.K. Borthakur 2011. Conservation strategies for Nepenthes khasiana in the Nokrek Biosphere Reserve of Garo Hills, northeast, India. International Journal of Conservation Science 2(1): 55–64. 
 Singh, B., S.K. Borthakur & S.J. Phukan 2014. A survey of ethnomedicinal plants utilized by the indigenous people of Garo Hills with special reference to the Nokrek Biosphere Reserve (Meghalaya), India. Journal of Herbs, Spices & Medicinal Plants 20(1): 1–30. 
 Slack, A. 1979. Nepenthes khasiana. In: Carnivorous Plants. Ebury Press, London. p. 86.
 Subramanyam, K. & L.L. Narayana 1971. A contribution to the floral anatomy of Nepenthes khasiana Hook f.. Proceedings of the Indian Academy of Sciences, Section B 73(3): 124–131. 
 Tynsong, H., B.K. Tiwari & M.B. Lynser 2006. Medicinal plants of Meghalaya, India. Medplant Network News 6(2): 7–10.
  Vassilyev, A.E. 2006. Ультраструктура и субклеточные механизмы функционирования пищеварительных железок плотоядного растения Nepenthes khasiana (Nepenthaceae). Botanicheskii Zhurnal 91(12): 1883–1891.
  Vassilyev, A.E. & L.E. Muravnik 2007. Нектарники крышки в закрытых кувшинах Nepenthes khasiana (Nepenthaceae) секретируют пищеварительную жидкость. Botanicheskii Zhurnal 92(8): 1141–1144.
  Vassilyev, A.E. 2007. Нектарники перистома в закрытых кувшинах Nepenthes khasiana (Nepenthaceae) секретируют полисахаридную слизь. Botanicheskii Zhurnal 92(10): 1554–1568.
 Venugopal, N. & N.R. Devi 2003. Development of the anther in Nepenthes khasiana Hook.f. (Nepenthaceae), an endemic and endangered insectivorous plant of North East India. Feddes Repertorium 114'''(1–2): 69–73. 
 Warwicker, M. 2013. Carnivorous plant species glow blue to lure prey. BBC Nature News, February 19, 2013.
 [Research and Development Centre, Flower Valley Agro-Tech] 2005. Nepenthes khasiana. In: Handbook of Medicinal & Aromatic Plants of North East India''. Spectrum Publications, Guwahati.
 From Carnivorous Plants to the Medicine Cabinet? American Friends of Tel Aviv University, February 18, 2010.

External links

 Video of plants in habitat

Carnivorous plants of Asia
khasiana
Flora of Meghalaya
Plants described in 1873
Species endangered by the pet trade
Flora of Assam (region)